Rome Township is the name of some places in the U.S. state of Pennsylvania:

Rome Township, Bradford County, Pennsylvania
Rome Township, Crawford County, Pennsylvania

Pennsylvania township disambiguation pages